"As She's Walking Away" is a song by American country music group Zac Brown Band. Written by lead singer Zac Brown, along with Wyatt Durrette, it features guest vocals from veteran country singer Alan Jackson. The song is the sixth single release by the band, and the first from the album You Get What You Give. It won the Grammy Award for Best Country Collaboration with Vocals at the 53rd Grammy Awards, and is the second Grammy for both the band and Jackson overall.

Release history
The song is the first release from the band's album You Get What You Give, which was released on September 21. John Driskell Hopkins, who plays bass guitar in the band, suggested that Jackson be included as a duet partner on it, because he thought that "it would get a great, different kind of fan base for us." Both Zac Brown Band and Jackson are produced by Keith Stegall.  On August 24, 2010, an exclusive CD single was released at Target featuring "As She's Walking Away" along with the studio version of "Colder Weather" for the first time.

Background and writing
Co-writer Wyatt Durrette told The Boot that the idea came when he and Brown went to a bar in Orlando, Florida to watch a UFC fight. Durrette said that while they were watching the fight a guy and a girl walked in and all night she stared at him. Durrette said that she was "a beautiful girl, but she had her boyfriend with her, so I obviously wasn't going to say or do anything. We kind of spoke all night from across the room, but didn't say anything to each other." Durrette said that Brown had the idea of bringing the wise man into it and turning it into the older man at the bar who's a much wiser man, giving you advice.

Critical reception
The song received critical acclaim. C.M. Wilcox of The 9513 gave the song a thumbs-up, praising the song's "driving, organic arrangement" as well as the interplay between Brown and Jackson. On the AOL Radio Blog, Amar Toor also described Brown's and Jackson's vocals favorably. A positive review also came from Michael Menachem of Billboard, who said that the song had a "heartwarming" sound.

Music video
Darren Doane directed the song's music video. The inside scenes of the bar were filmed in Dixie Tavern in Marietta, Georgia.  The outside scenes of the bar were filmed at The Trap located at 2822 East Avenue I, Lancaster, California.

Chart performance
In the week of its release, "As She's Walking Away" debuted at number 32 on the Hot Country Songs charts, as well as number 77 on the Billboard Hot 100. It later debuted at 81 on the Canadian Hot 100 chart for the week of October 9, 2010. On the country chart dated November 20, 2010, "As She's Walking Away" reached Number One, becoming the Zac Brown Band's fourth consecutive Number One single (and their fifth overall), and Jackson's twenty-sixth and final number one hit to date.

Year-end charts

Certifications

References

2010 singles
2010 songs
Zac Brown Band songs
Alan Jackson songs
Vocal collaborations
Songs written by Zac Brown
Songs written by Wyatt Durrette (songwriter)
Song recordings produced by Keith Stegall
Bigger Picture Music Group singles
Country ballads
Atlantic Records singles